Cleome cleomoides, commonly known as Justago, is a species of plant in the Cleomaceae family and is found in Western Australia.

It blooms between January and June producing yellow flowers.

It is found on sandstone ridges and outcrops throughout much of the Kimberley region of Western Australia where it grows in sandy soils.

References

cleomoides
Plants described in 1982
Flora of Western Australia
Taxa named by Ferdinand von Mueller